Love in the Modern Age is the twelfth studio album by American musician Josh Rouse. It was released on April 13, 2018 under Yep Roc Records.

Critical reception
Love in the Modern Age was met with "generally favorable reviews from critics. At Metacritic, which assigns a weighted average rating out of 100 to reviews from mainstream publications, this release received an average score of 68, based on 8 reviews. Aggregator Album of the Year gave the release a 76 out of 100 based on a critical consensus of 7 reviews.

Accolades

Track listing

Personnel
Adapted from Discogs

Musicians
 Josh Rouse – lead vocals, drums, guitar, producer
 Cayo Bellveser – organ , keyboards , backing vocals 
 Liz Bohannon – backing vocals 
 James Haggerty – bass 
 Alfonso Luna – drums 
 Xema Fuertes – electric guitar , backing vocals , vibraphone 
 David Gehrke – drums 
 Jim Hoke – saxophone 
 Marc Pisapia – drums 

Production
 Daniel Tashian – producer, vocals, drums, guitar
 Greg Calbi – mastering
 David Shaw – art direction
 Paz Suay – art direction, backing vocals
 Joe Pisapia – mixing
 Nathan Golub – art direction
 York Wilson – photography

Charts

References

External links

2018 albums
Josh Rouse albums
Yep Roc Records albums